The 2015 Bolivian regional elections were held on 29 March 2015. Departmental and municipal authorities were elected by an electorate of approximately 6 million people. Among the officials  elected were:
 Governors of all nine departments
 Members of Departamental Legislative Assemblies in each department; 23 seats in these Assemblies will represent indigenous communities, and have been selected by traditional usos y costumbres in the weeks prior to the election
 Mayors and Council members in all 339 municipalities
 Provincial Subgovernors and Municipal Corregidors (executive authorities) in Beni
 Sectional Development Executives at the provincial level in Tarija
 The nine members of the Regional Assembly in the autonomous region of Gran Chaco

Altogether, 2,642 officials were elected. Almost every elected office, but not Mayor, included a simultaneously elected alternate of the same party.

Political parties participating
Only the Movement towards Socialism was involved in all 339 municipal contests. Other parties participating in large numbers of contests are as follows:

Results

Bolivia's ruling MAS party suffered some defeats and setbacks in the subnational elections compared to its performance in 2010 and its victory in the 2014 presidential election.

Governors

The governors of Beni and Tarija were elected in a May 3 runoff election.

References

Elections in Bolivia
2015 elections in South America
Regional